The Port Vila Independence Cup is a cup held in Port Vila in July. The final match is played on July 30, Vanuatu's independence day. The cup is played by eight teams that played the previous Port Vila Premier League season. So, the 2019 cup was played by the teams that played 2018-19 Port Vila Premier League

Teams
The 2019 Port Vila Independence Cup was played by the eight teams that played 2018–19 Port Vila Premier League. That was the last official tournament of Amicale because the team ended its football activities.

Amicale
Erakor Golden Star
Galaxy
Ifira Black Bird
Shepherds United
Tafea
Tupuji Imere
Yatel

Quarter-finals

Semi-finals

Final

References

External links

Vanuatu Independence Cup
Independence Cup